Konstantinos Thymianis (born 28 February 2001) is a Greek professional footballer who plays as a centre-back for Super League 2 club Panserraikos.

Club career

Xanthi
On 26 September 2018, Thymianis made his professional debut against OFI in the Greek Cup.

References

2001 births
Living people
Greek footballers
Xanthi F.C. players
Panserraikos F.C. players
Greece youth international footballers
Super League Greece players
Association football defenders
Footballers from Ptolemaida